Samaria is an unincorporated community in Oneida County, Idaho, United States. The Samaria Historic District is listed on the National Register of Historic Places.

The Samaria Historic District is a  historic district which was listed on the National Register of Historic Places in 1979.  It included 36 contributing buildings.

The district is roughly bounded by Main and 3rd Sts., 1st Ave., N. and S end of 2nd St., in Samaria.

It was a Mormon town.  Numerous buildings were vacant in 1974 when the NRHP application was prepared.  Some former buildings in the district were demolished after the 1975 earthquake.

References

Unincorporated communities in Oneida County, Idaho
Unincorporated communities in Idaho
Historic districts on the National Register of Historic Places in Idaho
Oneida County, Idaho
Historic districts in Idaho
Populated places on the National Register of Historic Places in Idaho